Zapadnaya Dvina is a town and the administrative center of Zapadnodvinsky District in Tver Oblast, Russia, located on the right bank of the Daugava River,  southwest of Tver, the administrative center of the oblast. Population:

History

Zapadnaya Dvina was founded in 1900 as a station on the railway connecting Moscow and Riga. In 1927, it was granted urban-type settlement status. It belonged to Toropetsky Uyezd of Pskov Governorate.

On August 1, 1927, the uyezds were abolished, and Oktyabrsky District was established, with the administrative center in the selo of Staraya Toropa. Pskov Governorate was abolished as well, and the district became a part of Velikiye Luki Okrug of Leningrad Oblast. The district center was subsequently moved to the settlement of Zapadnaya Dvina. On June 17, 1929, the district was transferred to Western Oblast. On July 23, 1930, the okrugs were also abolished and the districts were directly subordinated to the oblast. On January 29, 1935 Kalinin Oblast was established, and Oktyabrsky District was transferred to Kalinin Oblast. In 1937, Zapadnaya Dvina was granted town status. Between October 6, 1941 and January 21, 1942, Zapadnaya Dvina was occupied by German troops. On August 22, 1944, the district was transferred to newly established Velikiye Luki Oblast. On October 2, 1957, Velikiye Luki Oblast was abolished, and Oktyabrsky District was transferred back to Kalinin Oblast. On February 13, 1963 it was merged with a part of Nelidovsky District to form Zapadnodvinsky District, with the administrative center in Zapadnaya Dvina. In 1990, Kalinin Oblast was renamed Tver Oblast.

Administrative and municipal status
Within the framework of administrative divisions, Zapadnaya Dvina serves as the administrative center of Zapadnodvinsky District. As an administrative division, it is incorporated within Zapadnodvinsky District as Zapadnaya Dvina Urban Settlement. As a municipal division, this administrative unit also has urban settlement status and is a part of Zapadnodvinsky Municipal District.

Economy

Industry
The economy of Zapadnaya Dvina and the district is based on timber production.

Transportation
The railway which connects Moscow and Riga via Rzhev passes through Zapadnaya Dvina. There is passenger railway traffic. The M9 highway connecting Moscow with Riga passes just north of Zapadnaya Dvina. A paved road to Ostashkov via Andreapol branches off. There are also local roads with bus traffic originating from Zapadnaya Dvina.

References

Notes

Sources

Cities and towns in Tver Oblast
Toropetsky Uyezd
Monotowns in Russia